Prima Cassetta di Musica Tamarra (Italian for First tape of "tamarra" music) is the first studio album by Neapolitan parody singer-songwriter Tony Tammaro.

Description 

In this album, Tony Tammaro shows who are tamarri (i.e. rough people that imitate manners of high society) in his home city and starts to talk about Neapoletan society with his funny songs. The lead track is Patrizia, that became very popular and helped him to have a successful career.

Track listing 

All tracks were written and composed by Tony Tammaro

 Patrizia (2:26)
 Il parco dell'amore (2:59) 
 U Strunzu (2:45) 
 'A cinquecento (2:40)
 Si piglio 'o posto (1:56) 
 Torregaveta (2:34) 
 Alla fiera della casa (2:19) 
 La pubblicità (2:20)
 Zio Tobia (1:28) 
 Il rock dei tamarri (2:00)

1989 debut albums
Tony Tammaro albums